Osmium hexafluoride, also osmium(VI) fluoride, (OsF6) is a compound of osmium and fluorine, and one of the seventeen known binary hexafluorides.

Synthesis 
Osmium hexafluoride is made by a direct reaction of osmium metal exposed to an excess of elemental fluorine gas at 300 °C.

 + 3  →

Description 
Osmium hexafluoride is a yellow crystalline solid that melts at 33.4 °C and boils at 47.5 °C. The solid structure measured at −140 °C is orthorhombic space group Pnma. Lattice parameters are a = 9.387 Å, b = 8.543 Å, and c = 4.944 Å. There are four formula units (in this case, discrete molecules) per unit cell, giving a density of 5.09 g·cm−3.

The OsF6 molecule itself (the form important for the liquid or gas phase) has octahedral molecular geometry, which has point group (Oh).  The Os–F bond length is 1.827 Å.

Partial hydrolysis of OsF6 produces OsOF4.

References

Further reading 
 Gmelins Handbuch der anorganischen Chemie, System Nr. 53, Osmium, Supplement Volume 1, pp. 111–114.

External links 
 Osmium hexafluoride at webelements.com.

Osmium compounds
Hexafluorides
Platinum group halides
Octahedral compounds